Ramón Ramírez (born 25 February 1977) is a baseball pitcher who is most notable for playing for Panama in the 2006 World Baseball Classic. A left-hander, he is 5'8" tall and he weighs 140 pounds.

He appeared in one game in the 2006 World Baseball Classic, pitching  innings and striking out two batters. He allowed one walk, but he allowed no runs.

He also played for Panama in the 2005 Baseball World Cup, 2007 Baseball World Cup and 2007 Pan American Games.

References

Living people
1977 births
2006 World Baseball Classic players
Baseball players at the 2007 Pan American Games
Pan American Games competitors for Panama
Panamanian baseball players